Cornell Powell (born October 30, 1997) is an American football wide receiver for the Kansas City Chiefs of the National Football League (NFL). He played college football at Clemson.

Early years
Powell attended JH Rose High School in Greenville, North Carolina. As a senior, he had 65 receptions for 1,557 yards and 38 total touchdowns. He committed to Clemson University to play college football.

College career
Powell spent 2016 to 2019 as a backup receiver. He took a redshirt in 2018 after playing in only four games. During those years, he totaled 40 receptions for 329 yards and three touchdowns. He became a starter for the first time his redshirt senior season in 2020. He finished the season with 53 receptions for 882 yards and seven touchdowns.

Professional career

Powell was drafted by the Kansas City Chiefs in the fifth round, 181st overall, of the 2021 NFL Draft. He signed his four-year rookie contract on May 13, 2021. He was waived on August 31, 2021 and re-signed to the practice squad the next day. He signed a reserve/future contract with the Chiefs on February 2, 2022.

On August 30, 2022, Powell was waived by the Chiefs and signed to the practice squad the next day. He was placed on the practice squad/injured list on January 3, 2023. On August 30, 2022, Powell was waived by the Chiefs and signed to the practice squad the next day. He was placed on the practice squad/injured list on January 3, 2023. Powell won Super Bowl LVII when the Chiefs defeated the Philadelphia Eagles. He signed a reserve/future contract on February 15, 2023.

References

External links
Clemson Tigers bio

1997 births
Living people
Sportspeople from Greenville, North Carolina
Players of American football from North Carolina
American football wide receivers
Clemson Tigers football players
African-American players of American football
Kansas City Chiefs players
21st-century African-American sportspeople